The 1912 Chattanooga Moccasins football team represented the University of Chattanooga as an independent during the 1912 college football season. This team finished its eight-game schedule with a record of 4–4.

Schedule

References

Chattanooga
Chattanooga Mocs football seasons
Chattanooga Moccasins football